Finally Rollin 2 is a self-released mixtape by American hip-hop recording artist Chief Keef. The mixtape was hosted by DJ Holiday. It features production from D. Rich, Fatboi, Jose Palacios, K-Rab, Lex Luger, Metro Boomin, Mike WiLL Made-It, Shawty Redd, Sonny Digital, Southside, TM88, MP808, Young Chop & Zaytoven. It was released on November 14, 2015, as a follow up to his debut album, Finally Rich (2012).

Track listing

‘Stunting Like My Mama’ heavily samples Stuntin’ Like My Daddy by Birdman and Lil Wayne

References

2015 mixtape albums
Chief Keef albums
Self-released albums
Sequel albums
Albums produced by Fatboi
Albums produced by Lex Luger
Albums produced by Metro Boomin
Albums produced by Mike Will Made It
Albums produced by Shawty Redd
Albums produced by Sonny Digital
Albums produced by Southside (record producer)
Albums produced by TM88
Albums produced by Young Chop
Albums produced by Zaytoven